South City Mall is a shopping mall in South Kolkata, West Bengal. Located at Prince Anwar Shah Road, Jadavpur (where the erstwhile Usha Industries factories and staff quarters were situated), it has been open since 16 January 2008.

The mall was designed by retail specialist ICS Bentel Associates. Anchored by major stores like Pantaloons, Spencer's Retail and Shoppers Stop, there are also 134 other stores, a food court on the top floor and an INOX multiplex.

The adjoining South City Township, with four 35-storey and one 15-storey residential highrises, was built by the same developer - South City Projects.

Features 
 South City Mall houses a six screen INOX multiplex, at the lounge cum food court inside the multiplex's premises. Now it also includes an IMAX multiplex, the only one of its kind in Kolkata.
 It houses a food court called The Food Street, which contains kiosks of food from around the world. It also features some restaurants like Mainland China. Confectionery is available at Kookie Jar, The Cream and Fudge Factory, Swirl's, Candy Treat, The Cookie Man, Coffee World, Spencer's Bakery, Cafe Coffee Day.
 It includes Spencers, pantaloons, CCD, Starmark and many more.

Incidents

Accident
In 2014, one person was killed and three others were critically injured in an accident.

Fire at the mall
On 4 December 2016 which was a Sunday morning at 9:15 am fire broke out at South City Mall Food Court. People noticed black smoke engulfing the food court. Security guards immediately severed electric connections and alerted people watching the movie show in the multiplex. The movie which was running in the Inox Movie Theatre was stopped and viewers and visitors were taken out safely from South City Mall. No people were injured.15 fire tenders rushed to spot and controlled the fire. Fire minister Sovon Chatterjee visited the spot. Following this incident the South City Mall management decided to shut down the mall for four months starting from 1 February 2017. During this temporary closure the mall is rumored to undergo some major makeovers to make it safer and more environment friendly.

Renovation
While some major makeovers were planned to increase safety after the fire breakout, the developers also announced an upgradation for the mall which started from 1 February 2017. It involved a complete renovation of the mall with most of the shops either being removed or shifted from their initial slot, and the entry of many new boutique global brands like Starbucks, Harley-Davidson (only clothing accessories) & many more.
A new floor is being constructed which is planning to accommodate the food court, which will be shifted from the 3rd floor, for making space for new shops. Thus, after completion, the mall will house 4 floors. Although the mall has been partially opened on 22 December 2017, construction work completed on 2018.

Gallery

See also
 Quest Mall
 Mani Square Mall
 New Market

References

2008 establishments in West Bengal
Shopping malls established in 2008
Shopping malls in Kolkata